The Kyle and Jackie O Show is an Australian late night radio show hosted by Kyle Sandilands and Jackie O on KIIS 106.5 in Sydney. The show is syndicated in the late drive slot on the KIIS Network following Will & Woody across Australia, and is a station on iHeartRadio.

History
The Kyle and Jackie O Show commenced on 16 January 2005 on 2Day FM. Kyle and Jackie O replaced former 2Day FM breakfast hosts Judith Lucy, Peter Helliar and Kaz Cooke.

The show has been Sydney's top-rated FM radio breakfast show for four consecutive years, and the program is a 9-time winner and 36-time finalist of the Australian Commercial Radio Awards. From November 2009 until December 2011, Kyle and Jackie O were also broadcast nationally on Saturdays between 3 p.m. and 7 p.m. during the syndicated Take 40 Australia show.

On 1 November 2013, it was announced the radio show will end on 2Day FM in December 2013 and move to rival station, KIIS 106.5 from January 2014.

The Kyle and Jackie O Show began on new station KIIS 106.5 on 20 January 2014 with a nightly "best bits" program networked on the KIIS Network (ARN) and regional radio stations. The show on KIIS 106.5 instantly went to number 1(FM) in the first radio survey for 2014 with the former radio station 2Day FM failing in the ratings.

In 2014, Kyle and Jackie O started a new show, The A-List with Kyle and Jackie O which also airs on KIIS 106.5, in Sydney, and exported globally. A weekly 3-hour entertainment show featuring the biggest stars and the hottest music in the world, co-produced with Bowserland.

Together, the prestigious radio show has won a total of 36 radio awards.

Time
The Kyle and Jackie O Show airs weekdays in the breakfast radio time-slot from 6 am to 10 am on KIIS 106.5.

The syndicated show, The Kyle and Jackie O Hour of Power, airs in metro markets from 6 p.m to 7 p.m each weeknight on the KIIS Network in Sydney, Brisbane, Adelaide, Melbourne and Perth, plus in regional areas on a number of FM stations on the Ace Radio and Super Radio networks.

Regular features

Jackie's O News
Presented every hour, Jackie's O News features Jackie delivering the morning's celebrity gossip and news. Due to the popularity and longevity of this feature, Jackie's O News will often "break" local and international celebrity news stories.

Notable breaking stories have included the revealing of the names of finalists for the Gold Logie.

Spoilers and leaks are also aired during the segment. In November 2010, the name of a dying character in the hit TV show Packed to the Rafters was revealed.

The $10,000 Pop Quiz
Every morning at 7 a.m. a listener is selected to answer 10 questions correctly within 60 seconds. The listener wins $100 for each correct answer, but is eligible for the top prize only if all 10 are answered correctly. Late in 2012, the $10,000 Pop Quiz eventually changed format to become the $50,000 Pop Quiz every weekday, which was won on 26 November 2012. The Pop Quiz varies from $5000, $10,000, $12,000, $15,000 or $20,000

For the first 3 years at KIIS, the Pop Quiz was played at 8 a.m. In its history, the Pop Quiz has given away in excess of $1 million, making it Sydney's "richest" cash radio contest.

Power Pick
Every morning at 6:30 a.m., a listener who is celebrating their birthday receives a prize, which is determined spinning the "Birthday Wheel". This was originally a small wooden wheel, but in January 2011 a new wheel was commissioned that includes hundreds of LED lights. The listener then picks a song to be played on-air. They have the choice of Kyle or Jackie O's song

First Calls & Last Calls
Every weekday morning at 6:20 a.m. and 9:50 a.m., listeners can call 13 1065 to talk about anything directly with Kyle and Jackie O.

Other games and segments

Tradie vs. Lady
Played every morning just after 6am, two listeners phone in, a male who will represent the tradies, and a female who will represent the ladies. The callers are asked 3 questions each, the tradie is asked lady questions and the lady is asked tradie questions.

What's in Jackie's Mouth?
Every Friday, Jackie places an item in her mouth. Listeners are given clues with sexual innuendo and are asked to assume what the object is. The listener who correctly identifies the object wins a prize, usually concert tickets. This game is alternating between others.

5-in-10
Listeners phone in to play 5-in-10. The team give out a broad category and listeners must identify 5 specific items of that area in 10 seconds. This game is alternating between others.

Google Predicts
A listener calls up and Jackie plays on behalf of the caller. Kyle will give the first half of a sentence from Google and Jackie must correctly guess the top search

ABC's
Jackie will ask listeners questions, but they have to answer with a specific letter of the alphabet. Listeners have 12.5 seconds to answer all five questions

Who Do You Believe
Kyle and Jackie are each told of a separate item that they must convince the listener is in studio, only one item is in studio whilst the other has to lie. If the listener correctly guesses who is telling the truth about the actual item that is in studio they win.

Only Lying
A listener has to try to convince a friend/relative they know of, is that what they have done is the truth, in which Kyle & Jackie would end the call by saying, "Only Lying" before it goes too far. That listener would then be rewarded with $1000.

Gibberish
Based on the infamous game on Instagram, two listeners call up & Jackie & Brooklyn plays on the callers behalf. Kyle will give the phrase/sentence that is in gibberish and Jackie and Brooklyn must correctly identify what the phrase/sentence is actually saying.

2Q's for 20K
Listener calls up and Jackie & Kyle play on behalf of the caller. Jackie is placed with the listener in the Cone of Silence first, to which Brooklyn gives the two words. Kyle names the first thing that comes to mind relating to those two words, then he goes into the cone of silence and Jackie comes out with the listener does the same. If both Kyle and Jackie's answers end up matching, then that listener wins $20K.

Ratings
Since July 2018, The Kyle and Jackie O Show has recorded the largest audience among Sydney breakfast FM shows in every radio survey. As of September 2021, the show had a 10.7% market share of the total Sydney breakfast time slot. In the period April–June 2021 the show recorded the largest audience across all Sydney breakfast shows (AM/FM) with a market share of 15.5%, their highest result. Host Kyle Sandilands attributes the show's rating success in part to his and Jackie O's tendency to say what they are thinking, "even if [we're] not sure".

The syndicated Kyle and Jackie O Show: Hour of Power airs nationally on various regional radio stations, reaching 5.3 million Australians on the KIIS Network and an additional 6.4 million Australians on Ace Radio's regional stations.
Kyle and Jackie O's global show, Alist with Kyle and Jackie O, co-produced with Bowserland attracts an audience of more than 1.2 million listeners from radio stations in Australia and across the globe. After the show commenced in the Sydney breakfast market in January 2005, it needed only 12 months to claim the top spot in the FM ratings.

Complaints
In August 2009, Kyle and Jackie O were suspended following a segment in which they put a 14-year-old girl on a lie-detector and then asked her about her sexual history.  After the girl revealed that she had been a victim of rape, Sandilands asked "Right ... is that the only experience you’ve had?" Following this incident, a full-time censor was brought on board. Despite the suspension and scandal, Kyle and Jackie O maintained their number-one position in the market, and the show actually grew 0.6 percentage points.

In September 2009, Sandilands apologised after making an on-air remark about how actor Magda Szubanski could lose a lot more weight if she had spent time in a concentration camp. Although Szubanski indicated that it was a "beat up" and that she "couldn't care less," Sandilands was still suspended.

In July 2011, Sandilands made headlines after stating that Australian model Megan Gale was a "phony" and that he "never liked her". Gale's management responded by cancelling Gale's upcoming interview on the show. Later that week, model Charlotte Dawson hit out at Sandilands on her Twitter account, saying that he could "f*** off".

In August 2011, Sandilands faced criticism from the Indian community over comments he made on the show about the cleanliness of the Ganges River. The Universal Society of Hinduism later admitted that there was no malice behind Sandilands's comments and accepted his reasoning.

In November 2011, Sandilands used his radio show to launch abuse at Daily Telegraph columnist Alison Henderson, for her negative review of the Kyle & Jackie O TV show (which had performed poorly in the ratings). Sandilands called Henderson a "fat slag" and a "piece of shit", accused the columnist of bias because "she just hates us and has always hated us", before making more derogatory comments about her body. The ACMA investigation into the show imposed further restrictions on 2DayFM, meaning that the radio station would be in breach if any broadcast made statements to demean women or girls.

In May 2016, legal action was launched against Jackie O and the Australian Radio Network, after Jackie O questioned the parentage of NRL player Kieran Foran's son on air. Jackie O made the claim in late April, after it was revealed that Foran had checked into a mental health clinic, and had been granted indefinite leave from his club. Rugby league writer, Danny Weidler responded at the time "The suggestion from Jackie O on Kiis1065 that Kieran Foran's baby boy is not his is false and offensive to all concerned". The legal demand instructed the show to make a full retraction of the defamatory allegation against Foran and his ex-partner, and issue an unreserved apology.

The team
The Kyle and Jackie O Show has a total of five content producers and two audio producers.

The show is overseen by KIIS 106.5's Head of Content (and formerly the show's Executive Producer), Derek "DB" Bargwanna.

According to Media Week Australia, The Kyle and Jackie O Show's content production team is one of Australia's most formidable production teams.

The show's producers reportedly work 12 hours a day or more in order to keep the show's ratings at number 1.

Former team/producers

Fill-in hosts

2Day FM

Andrew Günsberg
Brian McFadden
Charli Robinson
Chris Page
Daniel "Mandy" Cassin
Dannii Minogue
Didier Cohen
Fifi Box
George Houvardas
Hamish & Andy
Hugh Sheridan
Jules Lund
Matty Acton
Lara Bingle
Matt Preston
Mel B
Pete Timbs
Sophie Monk

KIIS 106.5
Brooklyn Ross
Zoe Marshall
Sophie Monk
Beau Ryan
Mitch Churi
Nat Penfold
Martha Kalifatidis
Sonia Jahshan
Brittney Hockley

Notable celebrity guests
KIIS FM confirmed media reports in April 2016 that the program, on occasion, compensates celebrities for appearing on the program.

Adam Sandler
Andy Cohen
Angelina Jolie
Whackhead Simpson
Ben Stiller
Beyoncé
Brad Pitt
Cameron Diaz
Chris Brown
Chris Rock
Dannii Minogue
Dolly Parton
Dr Phil McGraw
Elton John
Eva Longoria
Flavor Flav
Hugh Jackman
Jack Black
James Franco
Jay-Z
Jennifer Aniston
Jennifer Lopez
Jessica Alba
John Travolta
Jon Bon Jovi
Josh Duhamel
Jude Law
Justin Bieber
Justin Timberlake
Kate Hudson
Katherine Heigl
Khloé Kardashian
Kim Kardashian
Kit Harington
Kris Jenner
Kristen Stewart
Lady Gaga
Leonardo DiCaprio
Mark Wahlberg
Morgan Freeman
Natalie Portman
Nicole Kidman
Nicole Scherzinger
Nicki Minaj
Oprah
Reese Witherspoon
Rob Lowe
Robert Downey Jr.
Robert Pattinson
Ryan Seacrest
Sacha Baron Cohen
Sarah Jessica Parker
Taylor Swift
The Kid Laroi
Teri Hatcher
Will Smith
Zac Efron

Australian Commercial Radio Awards
Since 2004, The Kyle & Jackie O Show has been a 36-time finalist and a 9-time winner of the Australian Commercial Radio Awards.

|-
| 2004
| Molly Meldrum Telephone Scam
| Best Comedy Segment
| 
|-
| 2004
| The Kyle and Jackie O Show
| Best On-Air Team
| 
|-
| 2004
| Live from the ARIAs 2003
| Best Music Special
| 
|-
| 2005
| The Kyle and Jackie O Show
| Best Networked Program
| 
|-
| 2005
| The Kyle and Jackie O Show
| Best On-Air Team
| 
|-
| 2005
| Geoff Field
| Best News Presenter
| 
|-
| 2006
| The Kyle and Jackie O Show
| Best Networked Program
| 
|-
| 2006
| The Kyle and Jackie O Show
| Best on Air Team
| 
|-
| 2006
| Sydney's First Illegal Gay Wedding
| Best Station Promotion
| 
|-
| 2007
| The Kyle and Jackie O Show
| Best On-Air Team
| 
|-
| 2007
| Derek Bargwanna
| Best Show Producer
| 
|-
| 2007
| Kyle and Jackie O Boost Your Life
| Best Station Promotion
| 
|-
| 2007
| Geoff Field
| Best News Presenter
| 
|-
| 2007
| Kyle and Jackie O's Hour of Power with Robbie Williams
| Best Music Special
| 
|-
| 2007
| The Kyle and Jackie O Show
| Best Networked Program
| 
|-
| 2007
| Kyle and Jackie O's Hour of No Power
| Best Community Service Project
| 
|-
| 2008
| The Kyle and Jackie O Show
| Best On-Air Team
| 
|-
| 2008
| Geoff Field
| Best News Presenter
| 
|-
| 2008
| Ten Things I Hate About You
| Best Music Special
| 
|-
| 2008
| Kyle and Jackie O's Nude Wedding
| Best Station Promotion
| 
|-
| 2008
| The Kyle and Jackie O Show
| Best Networked Program
| 
|-
| 2008
| Kyle and Jackie O's Priscilla with the Stars
| Best Sales Promotion
| 
|-
| 2009
| The Kyle and Jackie O Show
| Best On-Air Team
| 
|-
| 2009
| The Kyle and Jackie O Show
| Best Networked Program
| 
|-
| 2009
| Kyle and Jackie O's Heartless Hotline
| Best Station Promotion
| 
|-
| 2009
| Pink Meet and Greet
| Best Music Special
| 
|-
| 2009
| Geoff Field
| Best News Presenter
| 
|-
| 2010
| The Kyle and Jackie O Show
| Best On-Air Team
| 
|-
| 2010
| Sarah McGilvray
| Best Show Producer
| 
|-
| 2010
| Dinner with Kyle, Jackie O and Chris Noth
| Best Station Promotion
| 
|-
| 2011
| Sophie Monk
| Best Newcomer Off-Air
| 
|-
| 2011
| Gemma O'Neill
| Best Show Producer
| 
|-
| 2011
| Derek Bargwanna
| Best Program Director
| 
|-
| 2011
| Dan Bozykowski
| Best Achievement in Production
| 
|-
| 2011
| The Kyle and Jackie O Show
| Best On-Air Team
| 
|-
| 2012
| The Kyle and Jackie O Show
| Best On-Air Team
| 
|-
| 2013
| The Kyle and Jackie O Show
| Best On-Air Team
| 
|-
| 2014
| The Kyle and Jackie O Show
| Best On-Air Team
| 
|-
| 2014
| Derek Bargwanna
| Best Program Director
| 
|-
| 2015
| The Kyle and Jackie O Show
| Best On-Air Team
| 
|-
| 2015
| Kyle and Jack Give Back Wedding
| Best Station Promotion
| 
|-
| 2016
| Nic McClure
| Best Show Producer
| 
|-
| 2016
| The Kyle and Jackie O Show
| Best Multimedia Execution - Sales
| 
|-
| 2017
| The Kyle and Jackie O Show
| Best Multimedia Execution - Sales
| 
|-
| 2017
| The Kyle and Jackie O Show
| Best Community Service Project
| 
|-
| 2017
| Bruno Bouchet
| Best Show Producer
| 
|-
| 2017
| The Kyle and Jackie O Show
| Best Networked Program
| 
|-
| 2018
| The Kyle and Jackie O Show
| Best Multimedia Execution - Sales
| 
|-
| 2018
| The Kyle and Jackie O Show
| Best Marketing Campaign
| 
|-
| 2018
| The Kyle and Jackie O Show
| Best On-Air Team - FM
| 
|-
| 2020/21
| The Kyle and Jackie O Show
| Best On-Air Team - FM
| 
|-
| 2020/21
| Jackie Henderson
| Best Entertainment Presenter
| 
|-
| 2020/21
| The Kyle and Jackie O Show
| Best Multimedia Execution - Station
| 
|-
| 2020/21
| The Kyle and Jackie O Show
| Best Multimedia Execution - Sales
| 
|-
| 2020/21
| The Kyle and Jackie O Show
| Best Station Promotion
| 
|-
| 2020/21
| The Kyle and Jackie O Show
| Best Sales Promotion
| 
|-
| 2020/21
| Sonia Jahshan 
| Best Show Producer
| 
|-
|

Bibliography

Contributor

See also
Australia's Got Talent
Big Brother Australia
Take 40 Australia
The X Factor

References

External links
The Kyle & Jackie O Show

Australian radio programs
2000s Australian radio programs
2010s Australian radio programs
2020s Australian radio programs